Australian Armwrestling Federation is the governing body for the sport of Arm wrestling in Australia.

History

The Australian Armwrestling Federation is an organisation dedicated to the growth of the exciting sport of armwrestling within Australia. With the primary aim of achieving mainstream recognition and the status of a true strength sport, the organisation is working constantly to hold and promote armwrestling competitions of the highest possible level throughout Australia.

Structure
The national body has eight state member associations:

See also

Amateur wrestling in Australia
Professional wrestling in Australia

References

External links

 

Australia
Sports governing bodies in Australia
2001 establishments in Australia
Sports organizations established in 2001
Wrestling in Australia